Lollenbach is a stream of North Rhine-Westphalia, Germany. Its source is between Bürenbruch (a part of Ergste) and Letmathe. Near Reingsen, a part of Schwerte, Lollenbach and Reingser Bach merge to form the Elsebach. Lollenbach is used as a supplier of water for a small fish pond.

See also
List of rivers of North Rhine-Westphalia

References

External links 
Openstreetmap
TIM-online

Rivers of North Rhine-Westphalia
Rivers of Germany